"One for You, One for Me"  is a song by the Italian disco duo La Bionda from their 1978 album La Bionda. It was written by Carmelo La Bionda, Michelangelo La Bionda and Richard Palmer-James.

Track listing and formats 

 German 7-inch single

A. "One for You, One for Me" – 3:04
B. "There for Me" – 3:22

Credits and personnel 

 Carmelo La Bionda – songwriter, vocals
 Michelangelo La Bionda – songwriter, vocals
 Richard Palmer-James – songwriter
 Harry Thumann – engineering
 Matthias Härtl – engineering
 Charly Ricanek – arranger

Credits and personnel adopted from the La Bionda album and 7-inch single liner notes.

Charts

Weekly charts

Year-end charts

References

External links 

 

1978 songs
1978 singles
Baby Records singles
La Bionda songs
Number-one singles in Belgium
Songs written by Richard Palmer-James